Viktor Ivanov (born 1950) is a Russian politician and businessman.

Viktor Ivanov may also refer to:

Viktor Ivanov (stunt coordinator), Russian film director and stunt coordinator
Viktor Ivanov (film director) (1909-1981), Ukrainian film director
Viktor Ivanov (boxer) (born 1962), Ukrainian boxer
Viktor Ivanov (rower) (born 1930), Soviet rower
Viktor Ivanov (footballer) (born 1960), Soviet footballer
Victor Ivanov (water polo) (born 1984), Russian water polo player
Viktor Semyonovich Ivanov (1909–1968), Soviet poster artist